The 1948 Southern Conference men's basketball tournament took place from March 2–5, 1948 at Duke Indoor Stadium in Durham, North Carolina. The North Carolina State Wolfpack won their third Southern Conference title, led by head coach Everett Case.

Format
The top ten finishers of the conference's sixteen members were eligible for the tournament. Teams were seeded based on conference winning percentage. The tournament used a preset bracket consisting of four rounds, the first of which featured two games, with the winners moving on to the quarterfinals.

Bracket

* Overtime game

See also
List of Southern Conference men's basketball champions

References

Tournament
Southern Conference men's basketball tournament
Southern Conference men's basketball Tournament
Southern Conference men's basketball tournament
Basketball competitions in Durham, North Carolina
College sports tournaments in North Carolina
College basketball in North Carolina